The world's longest above-water mountain range is the Andes, about  long. The range stretches from north to south through seven countries in South America, along the west coast of the continent: Venezuela, Colombia, Ecuador, Peru, Bolivia, Chile, and Argentina.

This list does not include submarine mountain ranges.

Formation
Mountain chains are typically formed by the process of plate tectonics. Tectonic plates slide very slowly over the Earth's mantle, a lower place of rock that is heated from the Earth's interior. Several huge sections of the earth's crust are impelled by heat currents in the mantle, producing tremendous forces that can buckle the material at the edges of the plates to form mountains. Usually one plate is forced underneath the other, and the lower plate is slowly absorbed by the mantle. Where the two plates pass one another, heated rock from the mantle can burst through the crust to form volcanoes. The movement of the plates against one another can also cause earthquakes.

List

See also

List of mountain ranges
List of mountains
Continent

References

External links
Longest mountain range in the world
The Andes - Introduction
Arranging Ranges: Mountain Ranges of the World

Longest chains

Longest chains
Mountain chains in the world
Mountain chains, Longest in the world
Mountain chains, Longest in the world
Mountain chains